"The Yellow Peril" is an episode of the BBC sitcom, Only Fools and Horses. It was the fifth episode of series 2, and was first screened on 18 November 1982. In the episode, Del buys a consignment of yellow paint which, unknown to him, is actually luminous, a fact he only discovers when they use it to decorate a Chinese restaurant.

Synopsis
Del Boy is at a Chinese restaurant called the Golden Lotus and promises the owner Mr. Chin to paint his kitchen before the health inspector arrives. But Del cannot do it that day, because it is the anniversary of the death of his and Rodney's mother Joan.

At the cemetery, as they look at the fibreglass grave of their mother, Del tells Rodney that he remembers the words their mother said to him on her deathbed: "Look after Rodney for me, Del Boy. Share everything you've got with him, try to make him feel normal..." Del also informs Rodney that he had told Mr Chin that Rodney will help him paint the kitchen at the Golden Lotus tomorrow. Rodney refuses at first, but Del promises him a box of pornographic magazines in return for the painting.

The next day, the Trotter Brothers and Grandad arrive at the Golden Lotus and find unlabelled tins of paint to use. Rodney opens one to see that it is yellow paint. Rodney and Grandad then get to work, while Del disappears for unknown reasons. Before they begin painting, Mr. Chin explains that he received a telephone call from an anonymous man (later revealed to be Del) and said that the health inspector was coming to see him, and he better get his kitchen painted as soon as possible.

A few days later, back at Nelson Mandela House, Trigger arrives with another load of paint for Del, and upon being questioned by Rodney as to where the paint came from, reveals that he and Monkey Harris stole it from a storage shed in Clapham Junction, and that the paint is used for painting signs inside railway tunnels. Rodney is infuriated that they have been using stolen paint, which leads to an argument between Del and Rodney about the ethics of doing so, Del giving a long argument that stealing paint is good for the economy. This is interrupted by Grandad, who asks how anyone is supposed to read a painted sign inside a pitch black railway tunnel. Trigger explains that the paint is luminous, much to Del's horror. Mr. Chin phones complaining about his now very brightly glowing kitchen walls. Del explains that the luminous paint is designed to save money on electricity. With that, Mr Chin asks them to paint his living room too. Del suddenly remembers for what else he used the paint for.

The Trotters drive to the cemetery and find out where Del had been for the last couple of days: painting his mother's monument with the luminous paint, so in the middle of the night it emits a near radioactive glow. Del says that he will not bow his head to any town hall officials, but shall look them straight in the eye and say, "I am the man that's responsible – and I'm proud of it." But after having a double take at the monument, Del says that he, Rodney, and Grandad will pin the blame on vandals with Del saying "Let's get out of here before we get our collars felt!" before the credits roll.

Episode cast

References

External links

1982 British television episodes
Only Fools and Horses (series 2) episodes